Henry Frederick Joseph James Perceval, 5th Earl of Egmont (3 January 1796 – 23 December 1841), styled Viscount Perceval from 1822 to 1835, was a British peer and politician. An alcoholic from an early age, he inherited estates heavily encumbered by debt; avoiding writs for debt shaped much of his life. He was briefly elected a Member of Parliament, but may never have taken his seat, and spent much of his life either abroad or living under an alias. His solicitor took personal advantage of the Earl's incapacity for business, resulting in belated litigation with the next Earl in 1863.

Henry was the only son of John Perceval, 4th Earl of Egmont and his wife Bridget Wynn. He was privately educated, and was admitted to Trinity College, Cambridge on 21 September 1814. He received an MA in 1818.

By the time his father succeeded to the earldom in 1822, the family estates at Churchtown, County Cork and Enmore, Somerset were heavily encumbered with debts. While his father's seat in the House of Lords protected him from prosecution for debt, Perceval was not so fortunate, and was often forced to leave the country to escape writs. He developed dissipated habits early in life, and became an alcoholic. Perhaps to escape this wandering life, he began to seek a seat in Parliament (which would protect him from duns) in 1824, announcing he would stand for Penryn, where Henry Swann had fallen ill. However, he began his canvass too late to effectively compete for the vacancy and did not go to the poll. In March 1826, when George Watson-Taylor retired to take another seat, he was put in at East Looe on the interest of James Drummond Buller-Elphinstone. It is not clear that he ever took his seat; in April, his family's Irish agent and solicitor, Edward Tierney, was writing to him to beg him to "abandon his evil courses and his associates". He contested Penryn at the 1826 election, but was served with a writ, probably for debt, during the canvass and was defeated, lacking the means to make headway with a venal electorate.

Declared an outlaw for debt in 1828, Perceval fled abroad. In December 1828, he married Louisa Maria D'Orselet in Paris. Their son was born about four months later, and died sometime between 1835 and 1841. Perceval inherited his father's property on the latter's death in 1835; Enmore had been sold to pay debts in the previous year, while the Irish estates in Cork were so heavily encumbered that no buyer could be found. While he did assume his seat in the House of Lords (as Baron Lovel and Holland) in February 1836, he afterwards lived at Burderop Park with a female companion, Mrs. Cleese, who had lived with him before at Hythe; he took the alias of "Mr. Lovell" and claimed she was his sister. He was often drunk and neglectful of business as regarded his estate, although a clergyman of his acquaintance thought him a gentleman and intelligent in conversation. A legal appeal of his outlawry in 1838 ended when his solicitors were unable to prove that he was still alive. He left the country for Portugal in 1840; after the death of Mrs. Cleese, he returned to England and died in 1841. He was succeeded by his half-first cousin once removed, the 3rd Baron Arden.

Under the 5th Earl's will, Tierney was made sole executor and residuary legatee of the estate; the wills of the 4th and 5th Earls were not proven until 1857, after Tierney's death, by his son-in-law Sir William Darell. The 5th Earl's will was rather belatedly contested by the 6th Earl in 1863, on the grounds that Tierney had taken advantage of the 5th Earl's drunkenness to provide a misleading valuation of the estates which influenced the drafting of the will. The 6th Earl ultimately settled out of court with Darell, paying £125,000 for the return of the Irish estates; Tierney and his heirs had realized an estimated £300,000 for their stewardship.

References

1796 births
1841 deaths
Perceval, Henry Perceval, Viscount
Alumni of Trinity College, Cambridge
Perceval, Henry Perceval, Viscount
Egmont, E5
Earls of Egmont